The Iowa Derby is a Listed American Thoroughbred horse race for three-year-olds run over a distance of  miles (8.5 furlongs) on the dirt annually at Prairie Meadows Racetrack in Altoona, Iowa. The purse of the event is US$250,000.

Race History
The race was first run in 1989 as an ungraded stakes race. It became a Grade III event in 2010  and lowered back to Listed in 2018.

Records
Speed record:
 1:40.37 - Concord Point (2010)

Most wins by a horse trainer:
 4 - Bob Baffert (2000, 2010, 2011, 2016)
Most wins by a horse jockey:

 2 - Sidney P. LeJeune Jr: (1997,1998)
 2 - Shaun Bridgmohan: (2004, 2006)

Most wins by an horse owner:

No owner has won more than once

Winners since 1999

 In 2020, Letmeno finished first but was disqualified due to interference and placed second. The runner-up, Acre, was awarded first.

References

 The 2007 Iowa Derby win for Pete Anderson and Delightful Kiss at ESPN
 Prairie Meadows racing at the NTRA

Graded stakes races in the United States
Horse races in the United States
Flat horse races for three-year-olds
Sports in Iowa